H. K. Young House (built 1920) is a historic building in Williamsburg, Virginia, United States.

Located at 205 Griffin Avenue, it is listed on the 
National Register of Historic Places (NRHP), and currently serves as the headquarters for the National Institute of American History and Democracy (NIAHD).
Constructed in the Dutch Colonial Revival style, the Young House is one of the oldest buildings in Williamsburg, predating the restoration of the Wren Building.

References

Houses in Williamsburg, Virginia